The 1904 Vermont Green and Gold football team was an American football team that represented  the University of Vermont as an independent during the 1904 college football season. In their third year under head coach Harry Howard Cloudman, the team compiled a 1–5–2 record.

Schedule

References

Vermont
Vermont Catamounts football seasons
Vermont Green and Gold football